Highway is the fourth studio album by the English rock band Free. It was recorded extremely quickly in September 1970 following the band's success at the Isle of Wight Festival but with an attitude of relaxation, the band having achieved worldwide success with their previous album Fire and Water (26 June 1970) and the single "All Right Now". It is a low-key and introspective album compared with its predecessors.

Recording
From a writing point of view Highway continued in the same vein as previous albums, with vocalist Paul Rodgers and bassist Andy Fraser collaborating on seven of the nine songs. For the most part it was the easiest of their albums to record as they had achieved their desire to have a hit single and returned to the studio with renewed confidence. Guitarist Paul Kossoff however found sudden fame more difficult to deal with, and remembered the aftermath of "All Right Now" as being "a great increase in pressure from every angle" (quoted in Phil Sutcliffe's liner notes). He preferred the more serious, weighty songs on the album such as "Be My Friend", which he saw as an antidote to the "frivolity" of "All Right Now".

It was their last album to be recorded in a position of success and security, as its failure contributed to the emotionally insecure Kossoff's growing drug addiction and the band's temporary split, from which it never truly recovered. Some, including drummer Simon Kirke, also cite the death of Kossoff's idol Jimi Hendrix (which occurred during the sessions for this album on 18 September 1970), as an important factor in his eventual breakdown.

Reception

Much to the band's disappointment, the album reached only No. 41 in the UK Albums Chart (the previous album Fire and Water had reached No. 2) and reached No. 190 in the US. The single release "The Stealer" failed in the UK also, but reached No. 49 in the US. (Rodgers and Kirke re-recorded "The Stealer" with Bad Company in 1975 during the sessions for band's third album Run with the Pack (1976), but the track was not included on the album). Rod Stewart and The Faces also featured it regularly in their live set.

The album received a lukewarm critical reaction. The single release "The Stealer" had not been Island Records boss Chris Blackwell's first choice: he had wanted to release "Ride on a Pony", but this was changed at the band's insistence. Some, such as engineer Andy Johns, blamed the album cover which was aesthetically flat compared to previous releases and did not prominently display the band's name. It was believed  that some fans who otherwise would have bought the album failed to notice it because of this. One UK newspaper even reported the album as being recorded by "The Highway group" stating "it's a good album for a party or discotheque, with a touch of the Rolling Stones' influence."

They returned to the studio in early 1971 and managed to record four tracks before they eventually split, after fulfilling contracted tour dates. These 'limbo' tracks included the UK No. 4 hit single "My Brother Jake"; the other three have surfaced on various other albums over the years. A notable cover version in 1971 is "Be My Friend" by Sylvia McNeill, produced by Tony Hall, on RCA 2058 (UK 45 rpm). "Be My Friend" was also covered in 1993 by Baby Animals featuring vocalist Suze DeMarchi.

Track listing
All tracks written by Andy Fraser and Paul Rodgers unless otherwise stated.

Side one

Side two

Bonus tracks

Personnel

Free 
Paul Rodgers – vocals
 Paul Kossoff – lead guitar, rhythm guitar
 Andy Fraser – bass guitar, acoustic guitar, piano
 Simon Kirke – drums, percussion
 Andy Johns – engineer

References

 Strong, Martin C. The Great Rock Discography, 6th edition. Edinburgh: Canongate Books 1994, 2002. pp. 392–3.
 Sutcliffe, Phil. Notes to Highway by Free. Universal Island Records Ltd. 1970, 2002.

External links 
 Free - Highway (1970) album review by Dave Thompson, credits & releases at AllMusic
 Free - Highway (1970) album releases & credits at Discogs
 Free - Highway (1970, Remastered 2011 with Bonus Tracks) album to be listened as stream on Spotify

Free (band) albums
Island Records albums
1970 albums
Albums produced by Paul Rodgers
Albums produced by Paul Kossoff
Albums produced by Andy Fraser
Albums produced by Simon Kirke